The discography of Jewel, an American singer-songwriter, consists of 13 studio albums, four live albums, five compilation albums, 38 singles, 35 music videos, five video albums and five spoken-word albums. She debuted in 1995 after signing with Atlantic Records.

Jewel's debut album, Pieces of You was issued in February 1995. Although it was initially not successful, the lead single, "Who Will Save Your Soul" eventually reached No. 11 on the Billboard Hot 100, pressing the album to later sell over twelve million copies. In addition, "You Were Meant for Me" and "Foolish Games" each became Top 10 hits on the same Billboard chart. Her second album Spirit was released in November 1998, certifying 4× Multi-Platinum in the United States. Its first single entitled "Hands" reached No. 6 on the Billboard Hot 100 that year. Her 2001 release This Way followed similar suit, certifying Platinum in the United States and producing the Top 30 hit, "Standing Still".

Her fourth album 0304 was released in June 2003 and aimed towards a more pop sound. It reached No. 2 on the Billboard 200 and certified Gold in the United States. The album's sound did not bring as major success as her previous releases, with its first single becoming the only major hit. In May 2006, her sixth album entitled Goodbye Alice in Wonderland was released, reaching No. 8 in the United States. Its sound was a departure from 0304, as its sound contained more elements that had originated in her debut album. Working with the country band, Big and Rich, Jewel issued her first country album in June 2008 titled Perfectly Clear. The release reached No. 1 on the Billboard Top Country Albums chart and spawned the major country hit, "Stronger Woman". Jewel has sold over 18.5 million records in the United States according to the Recording Industry Association of America.

Studio albums

1990s albums

2000s albums

2010s albums

2020s albums

Holiday albums

Children's music albums

Compilation albums

Live albums

Spoken-word albums

Singles

1990s

2000s to 2020s

Notes

A^ "Who Will Save Your Soul" peaked at No. 14 on the Canadian RPM Rock Singles chart.
B^ "Again and Again" was released as a double A-side single with "Goodbye Alice in Wonderland" in some countries.

Guest singles

Soundtrack singles

Miscellaneous

Guest appearances

Tributes
"You Make Loving Fun" (Legacy: A Tribute to Fleetwood Mac's Rumours)
"Body On Body" (Johnny Cash: Forever Words)

Soundtracks
"All By Myself" (Clueless - Not included on soundtrack CD)
"Emily"  (The Crossing Guard)
"Sunshine Superman" (I Shot Andy Warhol), a Donovan cover
"Under the Water" (The Craft)
"Have a Little Faith in Me" (Phenomenon)
"Foolish Games (Radio Mix)" (Batman & Robin)
"What's Simple Is True" (Ride with the Devil)
"Angel Standing By"  ("Return to Me")
"Sweet Home Alabama" (Sweet Home Alabama)
"Quest for Love" (Arthur and the Invisibles)
"Stay Here Forever" (Valentine's Day)
"Alaska: The Last Frontier Theme Song (Acoustic)" (Alaska: The Last Frontier - The Soundtrack)
"The Story" - from the American Song Contest

EP promos 
 1994: Save the Linoleum (PRCD 5999–2)
 1994: Shiva Diva Doo-Wop (cassette)
 1995: You Were Meant for Me aka Phyllis Barnabee Finally Gets a Bra (PRCD 6416–2)
 1999: Bits and Baubles (CD)
 2006: The Best of Jewel Unedited 2006 EP (CD)
 2010: Sweet and Mild (cardsleeve CD)
 2021: Queen of Hearts (digital)

Videography

Home videos

Music videos

References

Discography
Country music discographies
Pop music discographies
Discographies of American artists